William Makepeace Thackeray (1811–1863) was a British novelist, author and illustrator.

Thackeray may also refer to:

 Thackeray (surname), including a list of people and fictional characters with the name
 Bal Thackeray (1926–2012), Indian politician 
 Thackeray (film), a 2019 Indian biopic about Bal Thackeray
 Thackeray, Saskatchewan, a place in Canada
 , a ship, launched as SS Empire Aldgate

See also
 Thackray, a surname
 Thackrey, a surname
 Thackery (disambiguation)
 Thackeray's Globules, a group of stars in the IC 2944 nebula
 Thackeray Hall, an academic building of the University of Pittsburgh